Irvine Garland Penn (October 7, 1867 – July 22, 1930) was an educator, journalist, and lay leader in the Methodist Episcopal church in the United States. He was the author of The Afro-American Press and Its Editors, published in 1891, and a coauthor with Frederick Douglass, Ida B. Wells, and Ferdinand Lee Barnett of The Reason Why the Colored American Is Not in the World's Columbia Exposition in 1893. In the late 1890s, he became an officer in the Methodist Episcopal Church and played an important role advocating for the interests of African Americans in the church until his death.

Early life
Irvine Garland Penn was born on October 7, 1867, in New Glasgow, Virginia. He moved to Lynchburg, Virginia at the age of 5. He entered the newspaper business before his senior year in high school, and finished high school some time later. He continued his education, eventually receiving a master's degree from Rust College in 1890 and a doctorate from Wiley College in 1908.

Journalism
In 1886, he was a correspondent for the Richmond Planet, the Knoxville Negro World, and the New York Age, and frequently wrote about African Americans. In 1886, he became editor of a small black paper called the Laborer. In 1887, he became teacher in Lynchburg. He was promoted to principal of the school in 1895.

His writing became well known and frequently took on civil rights and injustice faced by African Americans. He published a volume of biographies of African American newspaper editors and journalists, The Afro-American Press and Its Editors, in 1891. In 1893, Frederick Douglass, Ida B. Wells, Ferdinand Lee Barnett, and Penn published a pamphlet, The Reason Why the Colored American Is Not in the World's Columbia Exposition, as a part of a boycott by African Americans of the 1893 Chicago Columbian Exposition in response to segregation of African American exhibits. Two years later, he was the director and organizer for the African American exhibits at the 1895 Atlanta Cotton States and International Exposition, and was important in the decision to put Booker T. Washington in a leading role, which partially launched Washington into the national spotlight.

Lay leader in the Methodist church
In 1897, he moved to Atlanta to become Assistant General Secretary of the Epworth League for the Colored Conferences of the Methodist Episcopal Church. Penn was also the creator of the National Negro Young People's Christian and Educational Congress, and he taught at Rust College. He also continued to write and published another book, The College of Life in 1902.

In 1912, he moved to Cincinnati and became the co-corresponding secretary of the Freedmen's Aid Society of the Methodist Episcopal Church. In this position, he was frequently a fund raiser for Methodist Colleges, particularly Rust University, Morgan College, and Philander Smith College. Among his closest benefactors was James N. Gamble (son of James Gamble of Procter & Gamble). In the mid 1910s, Penn took part in a movement for unification of Methodist churches in America which sought to mend the rift between North and South Churches largely due to slavery. Penn and Robert E. Jones were the leading African American members of the Joint Commission on Unification of the Methodist Episcopal Church. The pair played dual role in Methodist unification meetings in reassuring white delegates that they were not campaigning for racial social equality, but also working for the interests of black Methodists.

The ME Church combined the black and white boards of education in 1924, removing Penn from his position as secretary of the Board of Education for Negroes. Penn's work was severely criticized, although he remained a member of the combined board.

Family and death

He married Anna Belle Rhodes from Lynchburg in 1889. She graduated from Shaw University and taught there for several years. They had seven children.

Penn fell seriously ill in Cincinnati in early July 1930, a few weeks after the death of his wife. He died of heart disease on July 22, 1930. There is some speculation that his death was related to injuries sustained while being thrown off a segregated train car in South Carolina.

References

Sources
Davis, Morris L. The Methodist unification: Christianity and the politics of race in the Jim Crow era. NYU Press, 2008.

External links

1867 births
1930 deaths
People from Amherst County, Virginia
Writers from Lynchburg, Virginia
Educators from Cincinnati
People from Atlanta
African-American educators
African-American writers
African-American journalists
American male journalists
People of the African Methodist Episcopal church
Activists for African-American civil rights